The 2022–23 season is Pyunik's 29th season in the Armenian Premier League.

Season events
On 11 June, Pyunik announced the signing of Yusuf Otubanjo from Ararat-Armenia. The next day, 12 June, Pyunik announced the loan signing of Milad Jahani from Sepahan.

On 3 July, Pyunik announced the signings of Arthur Avagyan, Luka Juričić, Boris Varga, Andre Mensalao, Mikhail Kovalenko, Nemanja Mladenović, Marjan Radeski, Serhiy Vakulenko and David Davidyan.

On 19 July, Pyunik announced the signing of Alan Aussi from Dynamo Kyiv.

On 13 August, Pyunik announced the signing of Aleksandar Miljković from Partizan.

On 21 August, Pyunik announced the signing of Roman Karasyuk from Rukh Lviv.

On 29 August, Pyunik announced the signing of Robert Hehedosh on loan from Peremoha Dnipro.

On 2 September, Pyunik announced the signing of Stefan Spirovski from MTK Budapest, Grenik Petrosyan from BKMA Yerevan and Aleksandr Karapetyan who was last at Alashkert.

On 7 September, Pyunik announced the signing of Dame Diop who'd last played for Dynamo České Budějovice.

On 13 September, Pyunik announced the signing of Kire Ristevski who'd last played for AEL Limassol.

On 24 December, Pyunik announced that David Yurchenko had left the club, whilst the following day, 25 December, Zoran Gajić also left the club after his contract expired.

On 27 December, Artak Dashyan extended his contract with Pyunik until the summer of 2024. On the same day, Pyunik announced that Alexander González, Uroš Nenadović and Renzo Zambrano were all leaving the club. The following day, 28 December, Pyunik announced that Aras Özbiliz had also left the club, and that they had signed Henri Avagyan from BKMA Yerevan.

On 29 December, Pyunik announced a new one-year contract for Eugeniu Cociuc, and that Boris Varga, Nemanja Mladenović, Marjan Radeski, Robert Hehedosh and Aleksandr Karapetyan had left the club.

On 11 January, Pyunik announced the signing of Jonel Désiré. The following day, 12 January, Pyunik announced the signing of Edgar Malakyan.

On 17 January, Pyunik announced that Andre Mensalao and Dame Diop had left the club.

On 18 January, Pyunik announced the signing of James Santos, who'd played for Alashkert during the first half of the season.

On 3 February, Hovhannes Harutyunyan extended his contract with Pyunik, until the summer of 2024.

On 7 February, Pyunik announced the singing of Juan Bravo, who'd played for Ararat Yerevan during the first half of the season.

On 8 February, Luka Juričić extended his contract with Pyunik until the end of the 2023/24 season.

On 15 February, Pyunik announced the singing of Lucas Villela, who'd played for Liepāja during the first half of the season.

Squad

Goal scorers

Clean sheets

Disciplinary Record

References

FC Pyunik seasons
Pyunik
Pyunik
Pyunik
Pyunik